HodHod TV is a kids channels

Programming broadcast by HodHod TV
 Fix & Foxi and Friends
 Thomas & Friends
 Bernard
 Oggy and the Cockroaches
 Tommy & Oscar
 The Adventures of Tintin
 The Pink Panther
 Inspector Gadget
 Rainbow Ruby
 Care Bears & Cousins

External links

Arabic-language television stations
Children's television networks
Preschool education television networks